72 Miles - Ek Pravas is a Marathi film directed by Rajiv Patil  produced by Twinkle Khanna and Ashwini Yardi. The film, set in the 50's and 60's, is about journey of a 13-year-old boy who ran away from his hostel and how he matures with time when he meets a sympathetic woman and her children. Deepak Rane was the line producer for this film.

Plot

A young boy, Ashok Vhatkar, decides to escape from his boarding school in Satara. Chased by bullies, robbed by drunken gamblers, he starts his journey towards his village in the Kolhapur district. The very people who seem pleasant and invite him to ride with them turn into horrifying monsters as soon as they learn of his surname, a scheduled caste. Beaten to a pulp by the high-castes, the boy is then rescued by a woman Radhakka, who is on her way to Shigaon in the Walwa taluka of Sangli district with her sick infant son Sundarya and three other children. The journey continues as Ashok moves on with his journey and learns the true sorrows of poverty. In this journey, the infant Sundarya and his brother Ranu lose their lives. This journey of the silent, introvert boy makes him mature and then this boy educates himself and becomes a writer and writes his own story of the journey.

Cast
 Ashok Vhatkar: Chinmay Sant
 Radhakka: Smita Tambe
 Bayji: Shravani Solaskar 
 Ranu: Chinmay Kambli
 Bhimi: Esha Mane
 Akshay Kumar: Rajiv Patil

Soundtrack

References

External links 
 

2013 films
2010s Marathi-language films